Fearless is the 1988 debut album by British pop group Eighth Wonder.  It is the group's only UK album release, and contains six UK-issued singles (the earliest, "Stay with Me", dating back to 1985) including their highest-selling track, the Pet Shop Boys-produced and written "I'm Not Scared" (a No. 7 hit). Other singles included "Cross My Heart" which peaked at No. 13 in the UK.  Fearless peaked at No. 47 on the UK Albums Chart. The album was dedicated to James Henry Kensit, the father of Patsy and Jamie. Eighth Wonder split up in 1989, with lead singer Patsy Kensit going on to devote herself to her acting career.

Fearless was reissued in the UK by Cherry Red Records in January 2010, with the addition of five bonus tracks.

Track listing

2010 reissue bonus tracks

Singles 
UK Singles Chart positions
1985: "Stay with Me" (No. 65)
1987: "Will You Remember?" (No. 83)
1987: "When the Phone Stops Ringing" (–)
1988: "I'm Not Scared" (No. 7)
1988: "Cross My Heart" (No. 13)
1988: "Baby Baby" (No. 65)
1989: "Use Me" (–)

Personnel
Eighth Wonder
Patsy Kensit - vocals
Geoff Beauchamp - lead and acoustic guitar, drum programming
Steve Grantley - drums, drum programming
Jamie Kensit - rhythm guitar, additional keyboards
with:
Alex Godson - keyboards, keyboard programming
Graham Edwards - additional bass
Mike Collins - programming (tracks 7–10) - uncredited

Sales and certifications

References

1988 debut albums
Eighth Wonder albums
Albums produced by Mike Chapman
Albums produced by Alan Shacklock
Albums produced by Richard James Burgess
CBS Records albums
Cherry Red Records albums